Her Bodyguard is a 1933 American pre-Code comedy film directed by William Beaudine and starring Edmund Lowe, Wynne Gibson and Edward Arnold.

Cast
 Edmund Lowe as Casey McCarthy  
 Wynne Gibson as Margot Brienne 
 Edward Arnold as Orson Bitzer 
 Alan Dinehart as Lester Cunningham  
 Marjorie White as Lita  
 Johnny Hines as Ballyhoo  
 Fuzzy Knight as Danny Dare  
 Louise Beavers as Margot's Maid  
 Arthur Housman as Drunk
Blue Washington as Chauffeur (uncredited)

References

Bibliography
 Marshall, Wendy L. William Beaudine: From Silents to Television. Scarecrow Press, 2005.

External links

1933 films
American comedy films
American black-and-white films
1933 comedy films
1930s English-language films
Films directed by William Beaudine
Paramount Pictures films
Films produced by B. P. Schulberg
1930s American films